The leader of the Official Opposition, formally known as the leader of His Majesty's Loyal Opposition, is the politician who leads the Official Opposition in Canada, typically the leader of the party possessing the most seats in the House of Commons that is not the governing party or part of the governing coalition.

Pierre Poilievre has been the Leader of the Opposition since September 10, 2022, when he was elected leader of the Conservative Party of Canada, following the 2022 leadership election. He succeeded Candice Bergen, who had served as the party's interim leader from February 2, 2022.

Though the leader of the Opposition must be a member of the House of Commons, the office should not be confused with Opposition House leader, who is a frontbencher charged with managing the business of the Opposition in the House of Commons, and is formally titled Leader of the Opposition in the House of Commons. There is also a leader of the Opposition in the Senate, who is usually of the same party as the leader of the Opposition in the house. If the leader of the opposition party is not a member of Parliament (MP), then a sitting MP acts as parliamentary leader and assumes the role of the leader of the Opposition until the party leader can obtain a seat.

The leader of the Opposition is entitled to the same levels of pay and protection as a Cabinet minister and is often made a member of the King's Privy Council, generally the only non-government member of the House of Commons afforded that privilege. The leader of the Opposition is entitled to reside at the official residence of Stornoway and ranks fourteenth on the Order of Precedence, after Cabinet ministers and before lieutenant governors of the provinces. In the House of Commons seating plan, the leader of the Opposition sits directly across from the prime minister.

The term leader of the opposition is used in the Parliament of Canada Act and the Standing Orders of the House of Commons, as is the term official opposition. The terms leader of the loyal opposition, his majesty's opposition, and loyal opposition are sometimes used, but, are not in either the act or the standing orders. The word loyal is used to communicate the party's loyalty to monarch of Canada—as the nonpartisan personification of the nation and the state's authority—even as its members oppose the governing party.

Two leaders of the Opposition have died in office: Wilfrid Laurier in 1919 and Jack Layton in 2011.

Leaders of the Official Opposition

Deputy leaders of the Opposition

Official Opposition Shadow Cabinet 
The Official Opposition Shadow Cabinet in Canada is composed of members of the main opposition party and is responsible for holding the Government to account and for developing and disseminating the party's policy positions. Members of the Official Opposition are generally referred to as opposition critics, but the term Shadow Minister (which is generally used in other Westminster systems) is also used.

See also 

 Opposition House Leader
 Leader of the Opposition in the Senate (Canada)

Notes

References 

Government of Canada
Opposition
Opposition
Canada